Kaslo-Slocan was the name of a provincial electoral district in the Canadian province of British Columbia centred on the town of Kaslo on Kootenay Lake as well as the mining towns of the "Silvery Slocan".  The riding first appeared in the 1924 election as the result of a merger of the former ridings of Kaslo and Slocan, and lasted until the 1963 election.

For other ridings in the Kootenay region, please see Kootenay (electoral districts).

Demographics

Political geography

Notable elections

Notable MLAs

Electoral history 
Note:  Winners in each election are in bold.	

 
|Liberal
|Charles Sidney Leary
|align="right"|799
|align="right"|39.11%
|align="right"|
|align="right"|unknown

 
|Canadian Labour Party
|George Faulds Stirling
|align="right"|260 	
|align="right"|12.73%
|align="right"|
|align="right"|unknown

|- bgcolor="white"
!align="right" colspan=3|Total valid votes
!align="right"|2,043 
!align="right"|100.00%
!align="right"|
|- bgcolor="white"
!align="right" colspan=3|Total rejected ballots
!align="right"|
!align="right"|
!align="right"|
|- bgcolor="white"
!align="right" colspan=3|Turnout
!align="right"|%
!align="right"|
!align="right"|
|}  	  	  	 
  	  	  	  	   	 

 
|Liberal
|Charles Sidney Leary
|align="right"|1,113 		
|align="right"|48.77%
|align="right"|
|align="right"|unknown
|- bgcolor="white"
!align="right" colspan=3|Total valid votes
!align="right"|2,282 	
!align="right"|100.00%
!align="right"|
|- bgcolor="white"
!align="right" colspan=3|Total rejected ballots
!align="right"|69
!align="right"|
!align="right"|
|- bgcolor="white"
!align="right" colspan=3|Turnout
!align="right"|%
!align="right"|
!align="right"|
|}

|James Fitzsimmons 
|align="right"|951 	
|align="right"|34.27%
|align="right"|
|align="right"|unknown
 
|Liberal
|Charles Sidney Leary
|align="right"|1,250	
|align="right"|45.05%
|align="right"|
|align="right"|unknown
 
|Co-operative Commonwealth Fed.
|George Walton
|align="right"|574 	
|align="right"|20.68%
|align="right"|
|align="right"|unknown
|- bgcolor="white"
!align="right" colspan=3|Total valid votes
!align="right"|2,775 	
!align="right"|100.00%
!align="right"|
|- bgcolor="white"
!align="right" colspan=3|Total rejected ballots
!align="right"|31
!align="right"|
!align="right"|
|- bgcolor="white"
!align="right" colspan=3|Turnout
!align="right"|%
!align="right"|
!align="right"|
|}
	  	  	  	 

 
|Co-operative Commonwealth Fed.
|Amos Craven
|align="right"|929 		
|align="right"|33.93%
|align="right"|
|align="right"|unknown
 
|Liberal
|Charles Sidney Leary
|align="right"|1,064
|align="right"|38.86	%
|align="right"|
|align="right"|unknown

|- bgcolor="white"
!align="right" colspan=3|Total valid votes
!align="right"|2,738 
!align="right"|100.00%
!align="right"|
|- bgcolor="white"
!align="right" colspan=3|Total rejected ballots
!align="right"|30

 
|Liberal
|Charles Sidney Leary
|align="right"|941	
|align="right"|42.18%
|align="right"|
|align="right"|unknown
 
|Co-operative Commonwealth Fed.
|Hugh Earl Nelson
|align="right"|536 		 		
|align="right"|24.03%
|align="right"|
|align="right"|unknown
|- bgcolor="white"
!align="right" colspan=3|Total valid votes
!align="right"|2,231 	
!align="right"|100.00%
!align="right"|
|- bgcolor="white"
!align="right" colspan=3|Total rejected ballots
!align="right"|27
!align="right"|
!align="right"|
|- bgcolor="white"
!align="right" colspan=3|Turnout
!align="right"|%
!align="right"|
!align="right"|
|}

 
|Co-operative Commonwealth Fed.
|Randolph Harding
|align="right"|1,098
|align="right"|53.12%
|align="right"|
|align="right"|unknown

|- bgcolor="white"
!align="right" colspan=3|Total valid votes
!align="right"|2,067  
!align="right"|100.00%
!align="right"|
|- bgcolor="white"
!align="right" colspan=3|Total rejected ballots
!align="right"|34
!align="right"|
!align="right"|
|- bgcolor="white"
!align="right" colspan=3|Turnout
!align="right"|%
!align="right"|
!align="right"|
|}	

 
|Co-operative Commonwealth Fed.
|Randolph Harding
|align="right"|1,633
|align="right"|53.19%
|align="right"|
|align="right"|unknown

|- bgcolor="white"
!align="right" colspan=3|Total valid votes
!align="right"|3,070 
!align="right"|100.00%
!align="right"|
|- bgcolor="white"
!align="right" colspan=3|Total rejected ballots
!align="right"|38
!align="right"|
!align="right"|
|- bgcolor="white"
!align="right" colspan=3|Turnout
!align="right"|%
!align="right"|
!align="right"|
|}	 
 

 
|B.C. Social Credit League
|Edward Wilbert Bourque
|align="right"|597         
|align="right"|18.97
|align="right"| - 
|align="right"| -.- %
|align="right"|
|align="right"|unknown
 
|Co-operative Commonwealth Fed.
|Randolph Harding
|align="right"|1,411               	
|align="right"|44.84%
|align="right"|1,792     
|align="right"|64.18%
|align="right"|
|align="right"|unknown
 
|Liberal
|Thomas Melville Leask
|align="right"|617            	
|align="right"|19.61%
|align="right"|1,000  
|align="right"|35.82%
|align="right"|
|align="right"|unknown
 
|Conservative
|Howard Milward Parker
|align="right"|522         	
|align="right"|16.59%
|align="right"| - 
|align="right"| - %
|align="right"|
|align="right"|unknown
|- bgcolor="white"
!align="right" colspan=3|Total valid votes
!align="right"|3,147    
!align="right"|100.00%
!align="right"|2,792  	
!align="right"| - %
!align="right"|
|- bgcolor="white"
!align="right" colspan=3|Total rejected ballots
!align="right"|82
!align="right"|
!align="right"|
!align="right"|
!align="right"|
|- bgcolor="white"
!align="right" colspan=3|Turnout
!align="right"|%
!align="right"|
!align="right"|
|- bgcolor="white"
!align="right" colspan=7|2  Preferential ballot.  First and final counts of three (3) shown only.
|}  	  	
  	  	  	  	  	  	 

 
|Co-operative Commonwealth Fed.
|Randolph Harding
|align="right"|1,481 	 	 	 	 	 	    
|align="right"|47.17%
|align="right"|1,692    		
|align="right"|59.22%
|align="right"|
|align="right"|unknown

 
|Liberal
|Bessie Florence Leary
|align="right"|792 		 		
|align="right"|25.22%
|align="right"| -  
|align="right"| -.- %
|align="right"|
|align="right"|unknown
|- bgcolor="white"
!align="right" colspan=3|Total valid votes
!align="right"|3,140 	 	  		 
!align="right"|100.00%
!align="right"|2,027  	
!align="right"| - %
!align="right"|
|- bgcolor="white"
!align="right" colspan=3|Total rejected ballots
!align="right"|108
!align="right"|
!align="right"|
!align="right"|
!align="right"|
|- bgcolor="white"
!align="right" colspan=3|Turnout
!align="right"|%
!align="right"|
!align="right"|
|- bgcolor="white"
!align="right" colspan=7|3  Preferential ballot.  First and final counts of two (2) shown only.
|}
 	  	  	 

 
|Liberal
|Frank Harold Abey
|align="right"|297 		 	
|align="right"|10.67%
|align="right"|
|align="right"|unknown
 
|Co-operative Commonwealth Fed.
|Randolph Harding
|align="right"|1,512
|align="right"|54.31%
|align="right"|
|align="right"|unknown

|- bgcolor="white"
!align="right" colspan=3|Total valid votes
!align="right"|2,784
!align="right"|100.00%
!align="right"|
|- bgcolor="white"
!align="right" colspan=3|Total rejected ballots
!align="right"|50
!align="right"|
!align="right"|
|- bgcolor="white"
!align="right" colspan=3|Turnout
!align="right"|%
!align="right"|
!align="right"|
|}

 
|Co-operative Commonwealth Fed.
|Randolph Harding
|align="right"|1,298
|align="right"|50.35	%
|align="right"|
|align="right"|unknown
 
|Progressive Conservative
|John Verdner Humphries
|align="right"|244 	 	
|align="right"|9.46%
|align="right"|
|align="right"|unknown
 
|Liberal
|Thomas Melville Leask
|align="right"|303 	
|align="right"|11.75%
|align="right"|
|align="right"|unknown

|- bgcolor="white"
!align="right" colspan=3|Total valid votes
!align="right"|2,578 
!align="right"|100.00%
!align="right"|
|- bgcolor="white"
!align="right" colspan=3|Total rejected ballots
!align="right"|23
!align="right"|
!align="right"|
|- bgcolor="white"
!align="right" colspan=3|Turnout
!align="right"|%
!align="right"|
!align="right"|
|}

 
|Liberal
|Onni Matt Maja
|align="right"|301 		
|align="right"|10.92%
|align="right"|
|align="right"|unknown
 
|Progressive Conservative
|Donald Walter Williams
|align="right"|120 		
|align="right"|4.35%
|align="right"|
|align="right"|unknown
|- bgcolor="white"
!align="right" colspan=3|Total valid votes
!align="right"|2,756 	
!align="right"|100.00%
!align="right"|
|- bgcolor="white"
!align="right" colspan=3|Total rejected ballots
!align="right"|27
!align="right"|
!align="right"|
|- bgcolor="white"
!align="right" colspan=3|Turnout
!align="right"|%
!align="right"|
!align="right"|
|}	  	

The area was redistributed after the 1963 election.  For the 1966 election, the Slocan area became part of Revelstoke-Slocan, while the Kaslo area became part of Nelson-Creston.  The original riding name of Kootenay was re-established in this redistribution, but the new electoral district by that name was limited to the East Kootenay.

Sources 
Elections BC Historical Returns 1871-1986

Former provincial electoral districts of British Columbia
West Kootenay